Kevin Hill is an American legal drama that aired on UPN from September 29, 2004 to May 18, 2005.  It was filmed and produced in Toronto, Ontario, Canada.

Synopsis
The series stars Taye Diggs as the title character, a lawyer who has to balance his professional career and his love life with having custody of Sarah, his 10-month-old cousin.

Cast
 Taye Diggs as Kevin Hill
 Jon Seda as Damian "Dame" Ruiz
 Patrick Breen as George Weiss
 Christina Hendricks as Nicolette Raye
 Kate Levering as Veronica Carter
 Michael Michele as Jessie Grey
 Meagan Good as Melanie West

Episodes

International broadcast
Kevin Hill aired internationally on British channel ABC1, and was later picked up by E4 in the same country. It also aired on Channel 7 in Australia on weekdays at 3pm for a brief period.

References

External links
 

2004 American television series debuts
2005 American television series endings
2000s American drama television series
2000s American legal television series
English-language television shows
Television series by ABC Studios
Television shows filmed in Toronto
Television shows set in New York City
UPN original programming
Fiction about interracial romance